The Aeros ANT (Aeros Nanolight Trike) is a Ukrainian ultralight trike, designed and produced by Aeros of Kyiv. The aircraft is supplied complete and ready-to-fly.

Design and development

The ANT is a nanotrike, with an emphasis on lightness, simplicity and low-cost. It features a cable-braced hang glider-style high-wing, weight-shift controls, a single-seat open cockpit without a cockpit fairing, tricycle landing gear without wheel pants and a single engine in pusher configuration.

The ANT is supplied with a carrying bag into which the aircraft fuselage frame can be stowed for ground transport by automobile, after folding up the airframe. A separate bag holds the hang glider wing. The aircraft can be derigged for ground transportation in 6 minutes and can be set up to fly in 30 minutes.

The aircraft is made from bolted-together aluminum tubing, with its single surface, or optionally double surface wing covered in Dacron sailcloth. The wing is supported by a single tube-type kingpost and uses an "A" frame weight-shift control bar. The powerplant is a single-cylinder, air-cooled, two-stroke, single-ignition  Cors-Air M25Y engine, normally used for powered paragliders. The Cors-Air M25Y engine is equipped with a clutch that allows the propeller to stop at idle engine speeds. A Bailey engine is optional.

A number of different wings can be fitted to the basic carriage, including the basic Aeros Discus T, a version of the Discus hang glider wing for nanotrikes, that comes in two sizes, Discus 14T and 15T. The Fox T wing is a slow and maneuverable wing that can also be fitted. Higher performance can be obtained with the Combat T wing, a topless hang glider wing adapted for nanotrikes.

Specifications (ANT)

References

External links

ANT
2010s Ukrainian sport aircraft
2010s Ukrainian ultralight aircraft
Single-engined pusher aircraft
Ultralight trikes